Duke of Dorset was a title in the Peerage of Great Britain. It was created in 1720 for the politician Lionel Sackville, 7th Earl of Dorset.

History
The Sackville family descended from Sir Richard Sackville. His only surviving son, Thomas Sackville, was a statesman, poet and dramatist and notably served as Lord High Treasurer between 1599 and 1608. He was raised to the Peerage of England as Baron Buckhurst, of Buckhurst in the County of Sussex, in 1567, and was made Earl of Dorset in 1604, also in the Peerage of England. The titles descended in the direct line until the death of his grandson, the third Earl, in 1624. The late Earl was succeeded by his younger brother, the fourth Earl. He was Lord Chamberlain between 1642 and 1649. He was succeeded by his son, the fifth Earl. He married Lady Frances, daughter of Lionel Cranfield, 1st Earl of Middlesex. He was succeeded by his eldest son, the sixth Earl. He succeeded to the Cranfield estates on the death of his maternal uncle Lionel Cranfield, 3rd Earl of Middlesex. In 1675, two years before he succeeded his father, he was raised to the Peerage of England in his own right as Baron Cranfield, of Cranfield in the County of Dorset, and Earl of Middlesex. He was succeeded by his son, the aforementioned seventh Earl, who was made Duke of Dorset in 1720.

The Duke of Dorset was succeeded by his eldest son, the second Duke. The latter was succeeded by his nephew, the third Duke. He was the son of Lord John Sackville, second son of the first Duke. He was the British Ambassador to France between 1783 and 1789 in the lead-up to the French Revolution. He was succeeded by his only son, the fourth Duke. He died unmarried at an early age in 1815 after a fall from his horse. The titles passed to his cousin, Charles Sackville-Germain, 2nd Viscount Sackville, who became the fifth Duke. He was the son of George Germain, 1st Viscount Sackville, the third son of the first Duke (see Viscount Sackville). All titles became extinct on his death in 1843, though the baronies were later revived.

The family seat was Knole House, Kent, and the Sackvilles previously owned Buckhurst Park and Croxall Hall. On the death of the fourth Duke in 1815, Knole House was inherited by the late Duke's sister, Lady Elizabeth Sackville. She was the wife of George West, 5th Earl De La Warr, who assumed the additional surname of Sackville.

In 1865, the barony of Buckhurst held by the Earls and Dukes of Dorset was revived in Elizabeth's favour. In 1876 the Sackville title was also revived when her younger son Mortimer Sackville-West was created Baron Sackville.

Earls of Dorset (1604)
Thomas Sackville, 1st Earl of Dorset (1527–1608)
Robert Sackville, 2nd Earl of Dorset (1561–1609)
Richard Sackville, 3rd Earl of Dorset (1589–1624)
Edward Sackville, 4th Earl of Dorset (1590–1652)
Richard Sackville, 5th Earl of Dorset (1622–1677)
Charles Sackville, 6th Earl of Dorset (1638–1706)
Lionel Cranfield Sackville, 7th Earl of Dorset (1688–1765) (created Duke of Dorset in 1720)

Dukes of Dorset (1720)
Lionel Cranfield Sackville, 1st Duke of Dorset (1688–1765)
Charles Sackville, 2nd Duke of Dorset (1711–1769)
John Frederick Sackville, 3rd Duke of Dorset (1745–1799)
George John Frederick Sackville, 4th Duke of Dorset (1793–1815)
Charles Sackville-Germain, 5th Duke of Dorset (1767–1843)

In fiction

The plot line of David Gurr's thriller A Woman Called Scylla assumes fictionally that the Dukedom of Dorset did not become extinct but survived into the 20th century. In 1977, the book's protagonist is the granddaughter of George Frederick Henry, the 10th Duke of Dorset. He is mentioned as being born in 1886, having been severely wounded at the Battle of Ypres in World War I and later devoting himself to gardening. Other members of the Duke's family also have a big share in the plot, particularly his daughter Mary, an SOE agent in World War II captured and tortured to death by the Nazis. Another fictional 20th-century Duke of Dorset is one of the title character's suitors in Zuleika Dobson.

See also

Earl of Dorset
Marquess of Dorset
Earl of Middlesex
Viscount Sackville
Baron Buckhurst

References

Further reading
 

 
Extinct dukedoms in the Peerage of Great Britain
Duke
Noble titles created in 1720